Pedro Carrión Sago (born August 24, 1971 in Cuba) is a Cuban heavyweight boxer best known to win several medals in international amateur competition at super heavyweight.

Amateur
At the 2001 World Amateur Boxing Championships he beat Jason Estrada, but lost to Alexei Mazikin. At the 2003 World Amateur Boxing Championships he defeated Sebastian Köber but lost a war with Alexander Povetkin in the final.

Amateur Highlights
1994 won the gold medal at the Junior World Championships in Istanbul at Superheavyweight.
2001 won a bronze medal at the World Championships in Belfast at Superheavyweight. Results were:
 Defeated Jason Estrada (USA) RSCO-3
 Lost to Alexey Mazikin (Ukraine) PTS (20-26)
2001 3rd place at the Goodwill Games in Brisbane. Results were:
Lost to Rustam Saidov (Uzbekistan) PTS (15-23) (Semifinals)
Defeated Alexey Mazikin (Ukraine) PTS (14-10) (Third place Bout)
2003 won the silver medal at the World Championships in Bangkok at Superheavyweight. Results were:
 Defeated Ali Mansour (Lebanon) RSCO-4
 Defeated Oleg Kryzhanovsky (Belarus) RSC-2
 Defeated Sebastian Kober (Germany) PTS (26-18)
 Lost to Alexander Povetkin (Russia) PTS (27-29)

Pro
He turned pro at the advanced age of 34 in Germany but lost one of his first bouts; his record is 6-1.

External links

1971 births
Living people
Super-heavyweight boxers
Cuban male boxers
AIBA World Boxing Championships medalists
Competitors at the 2001 Goodwill Games